Brooklyn Nelson (born ) is an American actress. Born in  Huntington, West Virginia, Nelson began acting as a child in a local theater production of The Little Mermaid Jr. She made her professional debut on Broadway as a small girl swing in Matilda the Musical in 2015. In 2018, she returned to Broadway as young Elsa in the stage adaptation of Disney's Frozen after playing the role in the 2017 Denver pre-Broadway tryout to critical praise. In addition, Nelson lent her voice to the English dub of the characters of Nazuna Oikawa and Medmel in Fireworks (2017) and Maquia: When the Promised Flower Blooms (2018), respectively.

Early life
Nelson was born in Huntington, West Virginia, to Tara and Todd Nelson. She has a younger sister. Nelson became passionate about theater at the age of eight, when she landed a role in The Little Mermaid Jr. at Huntington's First Stage Theater. Subsequently, she appeared in several local productions by First Stage, Curtain Up Players and the Huntington Regional Theater. Nelson expressed interest in becoming a Broadway actress after seeing a performance of Matilda the Musical. In 2015, she graduated from fifth-grade at Village of Barboursville Elementary School. Nelson was a student at Barboursville Middle School. She remained enrolled while rehearsing and performing Frozen; her schoolwork was done online. As of 2018, she lives in New York City with her mother and sister.

Career
After Nelson expressed interest in performing on Broadway, her mother searched for open casting calls on the internet. In April 2015, she auditioned for Matilda the Musical; she was cast after multiple callbacks. In the last, she and three others were chosen out of thirteen girls. She rehearsed for eight to nine hours a day for six weeks to familiarize herself with the show's choreography and music. Her 16-month run in Matilda the Musical began in September 2015 at age eleven, where she was a small girl swing, shifting between the roles of Lavender and Amanda Thripp. She eventually moved fully onto the role of Amanda.

In February 2017, she attended an audition for Disney's Frozen, a Broadway adaptation of the 2013 film of the same name. After three callbacks, she was cast as young Elsa. For several weeks, Nelson attended rehearsals for approximately eight hours a day (including tutoring and schoolwork), six days a week. An older sister herself, Nelson took inspiration from her real-life dynamics with her younger sister and family. She first played the role in the Denver tryout in 2017, sharing it with Ayla Schwartz. Reception towards the show was mixed, though the performances garnered praise. Critics commended Nelson, with Variety stating: "The grown actresses  are matched pound for wee pound by the youngsters playing Anna and Elsa as girls. ... Nelson captures a big sister's kind attentiveness and, later, her guilt at accidentally harming [Anna]." Subsequently, she and Schwartz originated the role on Broadway in March 2018. She appeared in four of the production's eight weekly performances. She left the cast at the end of April 2018.

In 2017, Nelson voiced Nazuna Oikawa in the English dub of anime film Fireworks, which received mixed reviews. Her second voice role came in 2018's Maquia: When the Promised Flower Blooms, another anime film, in which she provided the English dub for the character of Medmel. The same year, Nelson appeared as the titular character in Megan's Christmas Miracle.

Credits

Theater

Film

Notes

References

External links
 
 
 

Living people
21st-century American actresses
American child actresses
American musical theatre actresses
American stage actresses
American film actresses
American voice actresses
Actresses from West Virginia
Actors from Huntington, West Virginia
Year of birth missing (living people)